The 2012 International ZO Women's Tournament was held from November 30 to December 2 of 2012 at the Curling Center Wetzikon in Wetzikon, Switzerland as part of the 2012–13 World Curling Tour. The event was held in a round robin format, and the purse for the event was CHF16,000, of which the winner, Michèle Jäggi, received CHF6,000. Jäggi defeated three-time champion and last year's runner-up Mirjam Ott in the final with a score of 4–3.

Teams
The teams are listed as follows:

Round-robin standings
Final round-robin standings

Playoffs
The playoffs draw is listed as follows:

References

External links

2012 in curling
International ZO women's tournament
International ZO Women's Tournament
2012 in Swiss women's sport
2012 in women's curling